Gertrude Eyifa-Dzidzienyo is the first Ghanaian woman to hold a PhD in archaeology. She currently lectures at department of archaeology and heritage studies at University of Ghana. Her research interest are centered on the interrelationship between archaeological findings and gender subjects, particularly women in Ghana. In 2017, she completed her PhD thesis on Archaeology and Heritage Management Practices in Ghana: Assessment of Tengzug Heritage Preservation and Development.

Early life and education 
Gertrude descends from the Fante people in Agona Nyarkrom, Central region. She is married with children She had her secondary education at Seventh Day Adventist Demonstration School and Juabeng Secondary Commercial School. In an interview with Mirror Ghana, she explained that her dissatisfaction with the absence of Ghanaian women in the field of archaeology was what prompted her to obtain a doctorate in the field as it will offer her an opportunity to train and motivate more females towards the discipline.

Selected publications

References

External links 
 Gertrude Eyifa-Dzidzienyo profile at University of Ghana

Living people
Ghanaian women archaeologists
University of Ghana alumni
Academic staff of the University of Ghana
Year of birth missing (living people)